Carla Marchelli (born 3 April 1935) is an Italian skier. She competed in Alpine skiing at the 1956 Winter Olympics and the 1960 Winter Olympics. She was the sister of the skier Maria Grazia Marchelli.

References

External links
 

1935 births
Living people
Alpine skiers at the 1956 Winter Olympics
Alpine skiers at the 1960 Winter Olympics
Italian female alpine skiers
Olympic alpine skiers of Italy
Place of birth missing (living people)